Midnat is the fourth studio album by the Danish singer Joey Moe - which is produced by disco:wax and disturbed by Sony Music. It's also his (officially) final album in Danish. It was released on 1 October 2012 exactly at midnight, which is also the translation from the title on Danish Midnat.
Midnat consists of CDs with the titles AM and PM, which is the opportunity for Joey to create real pop on the first CD, and more deep and experimental music on the other one.

Track listing

Disc 1

Disc 2

Joey Moe albums
2012 albums
Danish-language albums
Sony Music albums